Ambassis is a genus of fish in the family Ambassidae, the Asiatic glassfishes. They are found widely in the Indo-Pacific region, with species in fresh, brackish and coastal marine waters.

This genus includes fish known commonly as glassies, perchlets, and common glassfishes. The genus name was derived from the Greek anabasis, meaning 'climbing up'.

Species
There are currently 20 recognized species in this genus:
 Ambassis agassizii Steindachner, 1867 – Agassiz's olive glassfish
 Ambassis agrammus Günther, 1867 – sailfin glass perchlet
 Ambassis ambassis (Lacépède, 1802) – Commerson's glassy
 Ambassis buruensis Bleeker, 1856 – Buru glass perchlet
 Ambassis buton Popta, 1918 – Buton glassy perchlet
 Ambassis dussumieri G. Cuvier, 1828 – Malabar glassy perchlet
 Ambassis elongatus (Castelnau, 1878) – yellowfin glassfish
 Ambassis fontoynonti Pellegrin, 1932 – dusky glass perch
 Ambassis gymnocephalus (Lacépède, 1802) – bald glassy
 Ambassis interrupta Bleeker, 1853 – long-spined glass perchlet
 Ambassis jacksoniensis (W. J. Macleay, 1881) – Port Jackson perchlet
 Ambassis kopsii Bleeker, 1858 – freckled hawkfish
 Ambassis macleayi (Castelnau, 1878) – Macleay's glass perchlet
 Ambassis macracanthus Bleeker, 1849 – estuarine glass perchlet
 Ambassis marianus Günther, 1880 – estuary perchlet
 Ambassis miops Günther, 1872 – flag-tailed glass perchlet
 Ambassis nalua (F. Hamilton, 1822) – scalloped perchlet
 Ambassis natalensis Gilchrist & W. W. Thompson, 1908 – slender glassy
 Ambassis urotaenia Bleeker, 1852 – banded-tail glassy perchlet
 Ambassis vachellii J. Richardson, 1846 – Vachelli's glass perchlet

References 

 
Taxa named by Georges Cuvier
Taxonomy articles created by Polbot